Professor Mushtak Al-Atabi is a professor of mechanical engineering and currently the provost and CEO of Heriot-Watt University, Malaysia. His research focuses on thermofluids, renewable energy, biomechanical engineering, and engineering education. He is an Honorary Chair at the School of Mechanical Engineering of the University of Birmingham (UK) and the Editor-in-Chief of the Journal of Engineering Science & Technology. He has published three books, Think Like an Engineer, Shoot the Boss, and Driving Performance. He has numerous research publications, and has received various awards and honours. He is a Fellow of the Institution of Mechanical Engineers (FIMechE) and a member of the executive committee of the Global Engineering Deans Council.

Al-Atabi helped to develop the CDIO Initiative (Conceive, Design, Implement, Operate) and delivered the first MOOC (Massive Open Online Course) in Malaysia.

Education 
Al-Atabi attended Baghdad College from 1982 to 1988 and did his undergraduate studies in mechanical engineering at the University of Baghdad, Iraq from 1988 to 1992. He completed a Master's of Science in Mechanical Engineering in 1997. His master's thesis was titled "Experimental Investigation of Wing Tip Sails using Vortex Scanning and Forces Measurement."

In 2002, he joined the University of Sheffield, UK to pursue his Ph.D in Mechanical Engineering. His Ph.D thesis was titled "Cystic Duct to Static Mixer: A Serendipitous Journey”.

Career 
Al-Atabi began his academic career at the University of Baghdad when he was pursuing his master's degree. He moved to Malaysia in 1997 where he worked as a manufacturing manager at Lifelong Stainless Exhaust (M) Sdn Bhd, one of the country's main suppliers for OEM automotive exhaust systems.

In 1999, he joined Taylor's College School of Engineering as a senior lecturer for the University of Sheffield transfer programme, during which he taught engineering and IT subjects. It was also during this time when he initiated the Taylor's Research and Development Centre.

In 2004, Taylor's University College negotiated an agreement with the University of Birmingham to run their twinning programme. Al-Atabi worked as the head of department of the programme. In 2007, he was appointed as programme director for the programme. During this period he started the school's engineering fairs.

In 2009, Al-Atabi was appointed the dean of Taylor's School of Engineering when they launched their homegrown programme. During this period of time he was granted associate professorship at the school. In 2011 he was granted professorship by Taylor's University. During his time as dean, the school grew and flourished with project-based learning and CDIO; engineering undergraduate conference, EURECA; Grand Challenge Scholars Programme; and massive open online courses.

In 2014, Al-Atabi published two books: Driving Performance: Empowering People and Unleashing Potential and Think like an Engineer: Use systemic thinking to solve everyday challenges and unlock inherent values in them.

In February 2016, he was appointed the Pro Vice Chancellor for Strategy of Taylor's University.

Al-Atabi is currently the Provost and CEO of Heriot-Watt University, Malaysia, where he works with transnational teaching and student recruitment.

Books
Al-Atabi has written a number of books, including:

Shoot the Boss: Leading with Stories in the Age of Emotional Intelligence
Driving Performance: Empowering People and Unleashing Potential
Think Like an Engineer: Use systemic thinking to solve everyday challenges and unlock inherent values in them

Massive open online course 
In 2013, Al-Atabi ran an open online course by a Malaysian institution, Entrepreneurship on Open Learning. Since then he has run multiple online courses, and such courses have since become a part of Malaysia's national higher education agenda, with Open Learning as its content distributor. The higher education ministry of Malaysia is currently working on the framework to accredit MOOCs.

Written articles 
Al-Atabi has written for Malaysian newspapers.

Written articles 
 "Relevance of Soft Skills and Gratitude"
 "Views on Future-Proofing of Graduates"
 "Return on Failure"
 "Need for New Skills and Mindsets"

Published papers
Al-Atabi has published papers in the area of engineering education, fluid mechanics, thermodynamics and biomedical engineering.

 Al-Atabi, M.T. and DeBoer, J. 2014 “Teaching Entrepreneurship using Massive Open Online Course (MOOC).” Technovation. Vol. 34, No. 4, pp. 261–264.
 Applasamy, V., Gamboa, R.A., Al-Atabi, M.T. and Namasivayam, S. 2014. “Measuring Happiness in Academic Environment: A Case Study of the School of Engineering at Taylor's University (Malaysia)” Procedia - Social and Behavioral Sciences, Vol. 123, pp. 106–112.
 Aravind, C. V., Al-Atabi, M.T., Ravishankar, J., Malik, A., Arkar, and Ambikairajah, E. 2013. “Eco-tourism and Energy Demand Requirements: A Global Perspective.” Journal of Engineering Science and Technology. Vol. 8, No. 6, pp. 654 – 669.
 Al-Atabi, M.T., Shamel, M.M., Chung, E.C.Y., Padmesh, T.N.P, and Al-Obaidi, A. 2013. “The Use of Industrial Visits to Enhance Learning At Engineering Courses.” Journal of Engineering Science and Technology. Vol. 8, Special issue on Engineering Education, pp. 1– 7.
 Al-Atabi, M.T., Chung, E.C.Y., Namasivayam, S., Al-Obaidi, and A., Shamel, M.M. 2013. “A Blueprint For An Integrated Project Based Learning Framework In Engineering Education: A Case Study at Taylor’s University.” Journal of Engineering Science and Technology. Vol. 8, Special issue on Engineering Education, pp. 8– 18.
 Al-Atabi, M.T., Namasivayam, S., Chong, C.H., Chong, Florence, and Hosseini, M. 2013. “A Holistic Approach To Develop Engineering Programme Outcomes: A Case Study Of Taylor’s University.” Journal of Engineering Science and Technology. Vol. 8, Special issue on Engineering Education, pp. 19– 30.
 Namasivayam, S. Al-Atabi, M.T., Chong, C.H., Chong, Florence, Hosseini, M., Gamboa, R.A. and Sivakumar, S. 2013. “A Blueprint For Executing Continual Quality Improvement In An Engineering Undergraduates Programmes.” Journal of Engineering Science and Technology. Vol. 8, Special issue on Engineering Education, pp. 31– 37.
 Al-Atabi, M.T., Lim X. Y., and Shamel, M. 2013. “A Blueprint For Research-Led Teaching Engineering At Schools: A Case Study of Taylor’s University.” Journal of Engineering Science and Technology. Vol. 8, Special issue on Engineering Education, pp. 38– 45.
 Al-Atabi, M.T., Namasivayam, S. 2013. “Introducing research skill through the use of scientific method in engineering labs.” Journal of Engineering Science and Technology. Vol. 8, Special issue on Engineering Education, pp. 56– 61.
 Al-Atabi, M.T., Namasivayam, S. 2013. “Success Framework For Teaching Ergonomics To Engineering Students.” Journal of Engineering Science and Technology. Vol. 8, Special issue on Engineering Education, pp. 62– 66.
 Al-Atabi, M.T., Tong, K.T. 2013. “A Blueprint For Implementing Grand Challenge Scholars’ Programme:  A Case Study of Taylor’s University.” Journal of Engineering Science and Technology. Vol. 8, Special issue on Engineering Education, pp. 80-86.
 Shamel, M. and Al-Atabi, M.T. 2013. “Multidisciplinary Projects For Second Year Chemical And Mechanical Engineering Students.” Journal of Engineering Science and Technology. Vol. 8, Special issue on Engineering Education, pp. 87–92.
 Chew, M.K., Ooi, F.L. Al-Atabi, M.T. and Namasivayam, S. 2013. “Innovative Teaching And Learning Tools For Foundation In Engineering Education.” Journal of Engineering Science and Technology. Vol. 8, Special issue on Engineering Education, pp. 93–104.
 Al-Atabi, M.T., Ooi, R.C., Luo, X.Y., Bird, N. and Chin, S.B. 2012. “Computational Analysis of the Flow of Bile in Human Cystic Duct.” Journal of Medical Engineering Physics. Vol. 34, No. 8, pp. 1177–1183. DOI: 10.1016/j.medengphy.2011.12.006.
 Al-Atabi, M.T., Espino, D., Hukins, D. and Buchan, K. 2012. “Biomechanical Assessment of Surgical Repair of the Mitral Valve”. Proceedings of the Institution of Mechanical Engineers, Part H, Journal of Engineering in Medicine. Vol. 226, No. 4, April 2012 pp. 275 – 287.
 Al-Atabi, M.T., 2011. “Experimental Investigation of the Use of Synthetic Jets for Mixing in Vessels”. Journal of Fluids Engineering. Vol. 133, Issue 9, doi:10.1115/1.4004941.
 Shah, Q.H., Mujahid, M., Al-Atabi, M.T., and Abakr, Y.A. 2011. “Load Carrying Capability of Liquid Filled Cylindrical Shell Structures under Axial Compression”. Journal of Engineering Science and Technology. Vol. 6, No. 4, pp. 516– 529.
 Abakr, Y.A., Al-Atabi, M.T., and Baiman, Chen. 2011. “The Influence of Wave Patterns and Frequency on Thermo-Acoustic Cooling Effect” Journal of Engineering Science and Technology. Vol. 6, No. 3, pp. 392– 396.
 Al-Atabi, M.T., and Mahdi, A.S. 2011. “CDIO Curriculum for Mechanical Engineering Undergraduate Course”. Journal of Engineering Science and Technology. Vol. 6, No. 2, pp. 251– 259.
 Lad, N., Aroussi, A., Adebayo, D. and Al-Atabi, M.T. 2011. “Characterisation of Multiphase Fluid-Structure Interaction Using Non-Intrusive Optical Techniques”. Journal of Engineering Science and Technology. Vol. 6, No. 2, pp. 131– 145.
 Al-Atabi, M.T. 2011. “Design and Assessment of a Novel Static Mixer”. Canadian Journal of Chemical Engineering. Vol. 89, No. 3, pp. 550– 554. DOI: 10.1002/cjce.20412
 Aroussi, A., Lad, N., Muhamad Said, M.F., Adebayo, D., and Al-Atabi, M.T. 2010. “Analysis of the Interactivity of A Cold Atomised Spray Flow with A Convex Obstacle”. Journal of Engineering Science and Technology. Vol. 5, No. 3, pp. 361– 372.
 Al-Atabi, M.T., Chin, S.B., and Luo, X.Y. 2010. “Experimental Investigation of the Flow of Bile in Patient Specific Cystic Duct Models”. ASME Journal of Biomechanical Engineering. Vol. 132, No 4.
 Al-Atabi, M.T., Espino, D. and Hukins, D. 2010. “Computer and Experimental Modelling of Blood Flow through the Mitral Valve of the Heart”. JSME Journal of Biomechanical Science and Engineering. Vol. 5, No 1, pp. 78–84.
 Mahdi, A.S. and Al-Atabi, M.T. 2008. “Effect of Body Shape on the Aerodynamics of Projectiles at Supersonic Speeds”. Journal of Engineering Science and Technology (JESTEC). Vol. 3, No 3, pp. 278–292.
 Al-Atabi, M.T., Chin, S.B., Luo, X.Y. and Beck, S.B.M. 2008. “Investigation of the Flow in a Compliant Idealised Human Cystic Duct”. Journal of Biomechanical Science and Engineering. Vol. 3, No. 3, pp. 411–418.
 Al-Atabi, M.T. 2007. “Flow in Ducts of Polygonal Cross-Sections with Internal Corner Ribs”. International Journal of Heat Exchangers. Vol. 8, No. 2.
 Al-Atabi, M.T. and Abakr, Y.A. 2007. “Laminar Mixing in SMX Static Mixers”. Journal of Engineering Science and Technology (JESTEC). Vol. 2, No 1, pp. 95–101.
 Al-Atabi, M.T., Chin, S.B., Beck, S.B.M and Boucher, R.F. 2007. “From Cystic Duct to Static Mixer: A Serendipitous Journey via Flow Visualization”. Journal of Visualization (JOV). Vol. 10, No.2, pp. 141–144. (Invited paper).
 Al-Atabi, M.T., Chin, S.B. and Luo, X.Y. 2006. “Flow in Non-Circular Ducts with Corner Ribs”. Journal of Flow Visualization and Image Processing (JFVIP). Vol. 13, No 3, pp 203– 216.
 Al-Atabi, M.T., Chin, S.B. and Luo, X.Y. 2006. “Visualization Experiment of Flow Structures inside Two-Dimensional Human Biliary System Models”. Journal of Mechanics in Medicine and Biology (JMMB). Vol. 6, No. 3, pp 249–260.
 Al-Atabi, M.T., Al-Zuhair, S.A., Chin, S.B. and Luo, X.Y. 2006. “Pressure Drop in Laminar and Turbulent Flows in Circular Pipe with Baffles – An Experimental and Analytical Study”. International Journal of Fluid Mechanics Research (IJFMR). Vol. 33, No. 4, pp 303–319.
 Al-Atabi, M.T., Chin, S.B. and Luo, X.Y. 2006. “Cystic Duct Visual-Based Evaluation of Gallstones Formation Risk Factors”. Journal of Engineering Science and Technology (JESTEC). Vol. 1, No. 1, pp 1–9.
 Al-Atabi, M.T. 2006. “Aerodynamics of Wing Tip Sails”. Journal of Engineering Science and Technology (JESTEC). Vol. 1, No.1, pp 89–98
 Al-Atabi, M.T. 2006. “A Subsonic Jet Thrust Vector Control Using Fluidic Means”. Journal of Mechanical Engineering. Vol. 56, No. 6, pp 332– 338.
 Al-Atabi, M.T., Chin, S.B. and Luo, X.Y. 2005. “Flow Structure in Circular Tubes with Segmental Baffles”. Journal of Flow Visualization and Image Processing (JFVIP). Vol. 12, No 3, pp 301–311.
 Yusaf, T.F., Al-Zuhair, S.A. and Al-Atabi, M.T. 2005 “Performance of Diesel Engine Using an Emulsion of Biodiesel-Conventional Diesel Fuel”. Journal of Mechanical Engineering. Vol. 56, No. 3, pp 137–142.
 Al-Atabi, M.T. and Asrar, W. 2005. “Fluidic Thrust Vectoring: Challenges and Opportunities”. Journal of Mechanical Engineering, Vol. 56, No. 1, pp 1–17.
 Al-Atabi, M.T., Chin, S.B. and Luo, X.Y. 2005. “Visualization of Mixing of Flow in Circular Tubes with Segmental Baffles”. (Frontispieces). Journal of Visualization. Volume 8. No.2, pp 89.
 Yusaf, T.F., Al-Atabi, M.T. and Buttsworth, D.R. 2003. “Small Scale Power Generation using a Dual Fuel System”. International Energy Journal. Vol. 4, No. 2, pp 129– 138.
 Yusaf, T.F., Al-Atabi, M.T., Ali, Y. and Shamsuddin, A.H. 2001. “A Dual Fuel System (CNG-Diesel) for a Single-Cylinder, Stationary Engine Used in Power Generation”. Brunei Darussalam Journal of Technology and Commerce. Vol. 2, No.1.

References

Living people
Iraqi academics
Iraqi emigrants to Malaysia
1970 births
University of Baghdad alumni